Local elections were held on 21 November 2017 for Denmark's 98 municipal councils and five regional councils. All 2,432 seats were contested for the 2018–21 term of office, together with 205 seats (a fixed number of 41 seats in each council) in five regional councils. In the previous election, there were 2,444 seats in the municipal councils.

Results

Results of regional elections 

The Danish ministry of economy and interior informed that voter turnout was 70.6%. 3,074,840 cast their votes. They voted for 205 seats in the five regional councils. This number remains unchanged since the first elections for the regional councils in the newly created regions, which were set up 1 January 2007 after the 13 counties were abolished. The regions are not municipalities, but are financed only through block grants paid by the central government and their constituent municipalities.

Number of councillors and political parties in the Regional Councils

Old and new Chairmen of the Regional Councils

Results of municipal elections 

The Danish ministry of economy and interior informed that voter turnout was 70.8%. 3,226,558 cast their votes. They voted for 2432 seats in the 98 municipal councils, a reduction of 12 seats from 2444 after the previous election. The total countrywide number of seats in the municipal councils can be seen here and on the pages of the previous elections. They can be accessed from the template at the bottom of the pages.

Number of councillors and political parties in the Municipal Councils

The new municipal councils
Each municipal council consists of 9-55 seats, distributed over twelve established parties and a number of local parties.

Mayors in the municipalities
The mayors (Danish: Borgmester; plural: Borgmestre) of the 98 municipalities heads the council meetings and is the chairman of the finance committee in each of their respective municipalities. Only in Copenhagen, this mayor - the head of the finance committee and council meetings - is called the Lord Mayor (Danish: Overborgmester). The final decision on who would be mayor had to be made by the municipal councils no later than Friday, 15 December 2017.

Old and new mayors in the municipalities
The term of office for the mayors elected by the majority of councillors among its members in each municipal council is the same as for the councils elected, namely 1 January 2018 until 31 December 2021. The correct name for the municipality on the somewhat remote island of Bornholm is Regional Municipality, because the municipality also handles several tasks not carried out by the other Danish municipalities but by the regions.

Notes

References

2017
2017 elections in Denmark